Kolihapeltis is a genus of trilobite that lived from the Early Devonian to the Middle Devonian. Its remains have been found in Africa and Europe.

Sources 
 Evolving Pathways: Key Themes in Evolutionary Developmental Biology by Giuseppe Fusco and Alessandro Minelli

External links
Kolihapeltis in the Paleobiology Database

Corynexochida genera
Styginidae
Devonian trilobites of Africa
Devonian trilobites of Europe
Early Devonian first appearances
Middle Devonian genus extinctions